Betty White achieved numerous accolades during her acting and comedic career. Her major competitive awards include five Primetime Emmys, a Daytime Emmy, a Grammy Award, and two Screen Actors Guild Awards. Her honorary awards include the 2009 Screen Actors Guild Life Achievement Award, the 2010 Britannia Awards Charlie Chaplin Award for Excellence in Comedy, and the 2015 Daytime Emmy Lifetime Achievement Award.

By award

American Comedy Awards

Britannia Awards

The Comedy Awards

Disney Legends Awards

Emmy Awards

Gracie Allen Awards

Grammy Awards

Golden Apple Award

Golden Globes

MTV Movie Awards

NewNowNext Awards

People's Choice Awards

Screen Actors Guild Awards

Slammy Award

Teen Choice Award

TV Land Award

UCLA Jack Benny Award

Viewers for Quality Television "Q" Awards

Women Film Critics Circle Awards

Other honors

Hollywood Walk of Fame

Illinois General Assembly 
After her death, the legislative body in her home state of Illinois passed a resolution declaring January 17, 2022 to be Betty White Day.

References

White, Betty
Awards